Mary Baker (fl. 1842 – 1856) was an English painter of portraits and portrait miniatures.

She was born in London and produced works for the Society of Arts, as well as exhibiting miniatures and portraits at the Royal Academy over a fourteen-year period (1842–1856). An example of her work, painted in oils, is preserved in the Victoria & Albert Museum in London.

See also
English women painters from the early 19th century who exhibited at the Royal Academy of Art

 Sophie Gengembre Anderson
 Ann Charlotte Bartholomew
 Maria Bell
 Barbara Bodichon
 Joanna Mary Boyce
 Margaret Sarah Carpenter
 Fanny Corbaux
 Rosa Corder
 Mary Ellen Edwards
 Harriet Gouldsmith
 Mary Harrison (artist)
 Jane Benham Hay
 Anna Mary Howitt
 Mary Moser
 Martha Darley Mutrie
 Ann Mary Newton
 Emily Mary Osborn
 Kate Perugini
 Louise Rayner
 Ellen Sharples
 Rolinda Sharples
 Rebecca Solomon
 Elizabeth Emma Soyer
 Isabelle de Steiger
 Henrietta Ward

References

Foskett, Daphne (1972) A Dictionary of British Miniature Painters, Vol I, Faber and Faber, London

English women painters
Women of the Victorian era
English portrait painters
Portrait miniaturists
Painters from London
Year of birth unknown
Year of death unknown
19th-century English painters
19th-century British women artists